The 2023 Porsche Mobil 1 Supercup will be the 31st Porsche Supercup season. It is due to start on 19 May at the Autodromo Enzo e Dino Ferrari, Italy and will end on 3 September at the Autodromo Nazionale di Monza, Italy, after eight races, all of which will be support events for the 2023 Formula One Season.

Teams and drivers

Race calendar and results

Championship standings

Scoring system 
Points were awarded to the top fifteen classified drivers in every race, using the following system:

In order for full points to be awarded, the race winner must complete at least 50% of the scheduled race distance. Half points are awarded if the race winner completes less than 50% of the race distance. In the event of a tie at the conclusion of the championship, a count-back system is used as a tie-breaker, with a driver's/constructor's best result used to decide the standings.

Guest drivers are ineligible to score points. If a guest driver finishes in first position, the second-placed finisher will receive 25 points. The same goes for every other points scoring position. So if three guest drivers end up placed fourth, fifth and sixth, the seventh-placed finisher will receive fourteen points and so forth - until the eighteenth-placed finisher receives the final point.

References 

Porsche Supercup seasons
Porsche Supercup
Porsche Supercup